Extraction is a 2015 American action thriller film directed by Steven C. Miller and written by Umair Aleem. The film stars Kellan Lutz, Bruce Willis, Gina Carano, D. B. Sweeney, Dan Bilzerian and Steve Coulter. The film was released on December 18, 2015, in a limited release, and through video on demand by Lionsgate Premiere.

Plot
In 2005, undercover CIA operative Leonard Turner (Bruce Willis) is held captive and interrogated by a group of unidentified Russian arms dealers. His interrogators have been aware of Leonard's true identity and demand a full written list of individuals and businesses affiliated with the CIA in exchange for the safety of his wife and son. Leonard breaks from captivity and kills his interrogators, phoning his colleague Ken Robertson (D. B. Sweeney) to get his family to safety. Leonard's wife, Kate, was fatally shot by the interrogator's affiliates, while his teenage son, Harry (Nathan Varnson) hesitates on shooting the home invaders before being rescued by Robertson.

In 2015, an adult Harry (Kellan Lutz) joins the CIA's Prague branch under Robertson's wing much to Leonard's disapproval. While working as an analyst, Harry undergoes numerous field agent training sessions only to be rejected repeatedly by Leonard behind the scenes.

Meanwhile, Leonard is given an undercover assignment to recover an item called The Condor, a mobile computer capable of hacking the entire global telecommunications infrastructure that can only be deactivated with a physical key. While Leonard attempts to recover the device in Newark, New Jersey, he is ambushed and captured by arms dealer Drake Chivu (Joshua Mickel).

C.I.A. Director Theodore Sitterson (Steve Coulter) is brought up to speed on the recent development and assigns field agent Victoria Phair (Gina Carano) to recover The Condor while keeping Harry out of the investigation. Incensed, Harry breaks free from his security escort led by Higgins (Dan Bilzerian) and flies to Newark in order to investigate Drake's associates.

Harry's first visit is to a biker bar known for its business association with Drake.  After instigating a fight and being beaten by the patrons, Harry is rescued by Phair.  They interrogate the patrons and learn that Drake's brother is the lead mechanic at a local garage. It becomes clear that Harry and Phair previously parted from a romantic relationship on bad terms during their training. Harry only agrees to return after helping her recover the Condor and after rescuing Leonard. After interrogating Drake's brother, Harry and Phair learn that Drake is holding a party in a local nightclub. Enlisting Phair's roommate, Kris (Lydia Hull), Harry and Phair enter the nightclub. Meanwhile, Sitterson reviews Leonard's video-recorded ransom and prepares an assassin for deployment in suspicion of Harry having committed treason, much to Robertson's dismay. The assassin ambushes Harry in the nightclub's restroom while Drake captures Phair.

Maintaining contact with their communications earpiece, Phair gives clues to Harry while he and Kris try to locate Drake's car. The final destination leads them to an abandoned factory, where Harry is tranquilized by Drake himself before being reunited with Leonard.  Harry regains consciousness and is reunited with his father, only to find himself questioned on the people aware of Harry's whereabouts. Harry only confides that he told Robertson about his last known location, with Leonard's approval. At this point, Leonard reveals to his son that he went rogue and allied himself with Drake in order to draw out the people interested in recovering the Condor, as well as the perpetrators and CIA mole responsible for Kate's death. During the business deal, Leonard demonstrates the Condor's capabilities by sabotaging China's electronics infrastructure before double-crossing the Russian customers. The Russian customers have been revealed to be responsible for purchasing Leonard's personal information and ordering Kate's death, while Leonard has Harry fatally shoot the Russian ringleader.

After seemingly tying up the loose end, Robertson and Higgins intercept the Turners, with Robertson revealing himself and Sitterson as the moles responsible for Leonard's blown cover, and also responsible for the recent assassination attempt on Harry. Robertson shoots Leonard in the stomach. Phair breaks free from captivity and shoots at Drake's henchmen while Higgins engages Drake in hand-to-hand combat. Harry engages in a car chase with Robertson and fatally wounds him with a vehicle collision. Shortly after recovering the Condor, Harry destroys the device with an assault rifle to prevent it from falling to enemy hands and mourns his father's death before leaving the scene with Higgins, Phair, and Kris.

During the aftermath, Harry gives Phair a phone call to rekindle their romance before killing Drake with a car bomb.

Cast
 Kellan Lutz as Harry Turner
 Bruce Willis as Leonard Turner
 Gina Carano as Victoria Phair
 D. B. Sweeney as Ken Robertson
 Dan Bilzerian as Higgins
 Steve Coulter as Theodore Sitterson
 Christopher Rob Bowen as Nick Purvis
 Joshua Mikel as Drake Chivu
 Nicholas M. Loeb as Vinn Chivu
 Summer Altice as Denise
 Lydia Hull as Kris
 Tyler Jon Olson as Darryl
 Richie Chance as John
 Lindsey Pelas as Stephanie

Production
On January 20, 2015, it was announced that Bruce Willis would be starring in the film, Steven C. Miller was set to direct the film based on the script by Umair Aleem. Randall Emmett and George Furla's Emmett/Furla/Oasis Films would produce along with Adam Goldworm's Aperture Entertainment.

Filming
Principal photography on the film began on February 9, 2015, in Mobile, Alabama. Filming wrapped on March 15, 2015.

Release
The film was released on December 18, 2015, in a limited release, and through video on demand by Lionsgate Premiere.

Box office
As of November 11, 2022, Extraction grossed $1,063,836 in the United Arab Emirates, Kuwait, Lebanon, Oman, Portugal, Russia, Turkey, the United States, Taiwan, Vietnam, and Thailand.

Home media
Extraction was released on DVD and Blu-ray in the United States on February 23, 2016.

Critical reception
Rotten Tomatoes gives it an approval rating of 6% based on 18 reviews and an average score of 3.23/10. Metacritic rated it 25 out of 100 based on six reviews, indicating "generally unfavorable reviews".

See also
 Bruce Willis filmography

References

External links
 
 
 
 

2015 films
2015 action thriller films
2015 independent films
American action thriller films
American crime thriller films
MoviePass Films films
Lionsgate films
Films directed by Steven C. Miller
Films shot in Mobile, Alabama
2010s English-language films
2010s American films